The National Police of East Timor or PNTL is the national police force of East Timor.

History
The PNTL was established in May 2002 by the United Nations, before sovereignty was passed to the new state, with a mandate to provide security and maintain law and order throughout the country, and to enable the rapid development of a credible, professional and impartial police service. Recruitment drives were conducted in early 2000, and basic training commenced on 27 March 2000, under the auspices of the United Nations Transitional Administration in East Timor (UNTAET). On 10 August 2001, the East Timor Police Service was officially established, working alongside CivPol, the United Nations Civilian Police Force.

It was not until independence, on 20 May 2002, that an agreement was signed outlining the terms and timetable for handing over of full policing duties from CivPol to the PNTL. The PNTL finally assumed responsibility for the whole country on 10 December 2003.

Organization
There are at least three special units within the PNTL: the Police Reserve Unit, formerly the Rapid Deployment Service; the Border Patrol Unit (Unidade de Patrulhamento de Fronteiras, UPF); and the Rapid Intervention Unit, or UIR, modelled after the Portuguese National Republican Guard riot police, which served in East Timor before its independence.

Equipment

Vehicles

Firearms
 : Glock 19
 : Heckler & Koch G36
 : M16 rifle
 : Steyr AUG
 : FN FNC Mk2
 : Heckler & Koch HK33
 : FN F2000

Controversy
There are accusation that some PNTL officers have tortured prisoners who have been arrested.

Gallery

Historical police emblems

References

External links

 Official Website

Law enforcement agencies of East Timor